The 1986 African Cup of Nations Final was a football match that took place on 21 March 1986 at the Cairo Stadium in Cairo, Egypt, to determine the winner of the 1986 African Cup of Nations, the football championship of Africa organized by the Confederation of African Football (CAF).

Egypt won the title for the third time by beating Cameroon 5–4 on penalties with the game ending 0–0.

Road to the final

Match details

Details

References

Final
1986
Egypt national football team matches
1986
Africa Cup of Nations Final 1986
Africa Cup of Nations Final
African
March 1986 sports events in Africa
1980s in Cairo